Tabasco is a small town in the state of Zacatecas, Mexico.

External links
 

Populated places in Zacatecas